Jabesh was the father of Shallum of the Kingdom of Israel according to the Hebrew Bible. 

Jabesh is mentioned In the Books of Kings. However, the passage may instead mention a toponym, identifying that Shallum was "the son" of a city called Jabesh. In this view, Shallum may have originated from the Israelite town of Jabesh-Gilead. 

The name means "dry" in Hebrew.

See also
 Jabesh-Gilead

References

8th-century BCE Hebrew people
House of Shallum